Pylaisia is a genus of mosses belonging to the family Pylaisiaceae.

The genus has cosmopolitan distribution.

Species:
 Pylaisia alpicola (Lindb. ex Lindb. & Arnell) Limpr.
 Pylaisia appressifolia Thér. & Dixon
 Pylaisia australis Dixon & Sainsbury
 Pylaisia bollei De Not.
 Pylaisia brevirostris (Griff.) A. Jaeger
 Pylaisia brotheri Besch.
 Pylaisia buckii T.Y. Chiang & Lin, Chi-Yung
 Pylaisia camurifolia (Mitt.) A. Jaeger
 Pylaisia capillacea (Griff.) A. Jaeger
 Pylaisia chrysea (Schwägr.) Venturi & Bott.
 Pylaisia complanatula Müll. Hal.
 Pylaisia condensata (Mitt.) A. Jaeger
 Pylaisia coreana Nog.
 Pylaisia coreensis (Cardot) Toyama
 Pylaisia cristata Cardot
 Pylaisia curviramea Dixon
 Pylaisia decolor (Mitt.) A. Jaeger
 Pylaisia erectiuscula (Sull. & Lesq.) Mitt.
 Pylaisia extenta (Mitt.) A. Jaeger
 Pylaisia falcata Schimp.
 Pylaisia frahmii (W.R. Buck) Ochyra
 Pylaisia hamata (Mitt.) Cardot
 Pylaisia homomalla (Hampe) A. Jaeger
 Pylaisia intricata (Hedw.) Schimp.
 Pylaisia kunisawae (Ando) Ochyra
 Pylaisia latifolia Dixon
 Pylaisia leptoclada Renauld & Cardot
 Pylaisia levieri (Müll. Hal.) T. Arikawa
 Pylaisia macrotis Cardot
 Pylaisia nana Mitt.
 Pylaisia obtusa Lindb.
 Pylaisia plagiangia Müll. Hal.
 Pylaisia polyantha (Hedw.) Schimp.
 Pylaisia pseudoplatygyrium Kindb.
 Pylaisia robusta Broth. & Paris
 Pylaisia rufescens (Dicks. ex Brid.) De Not.
 Pylaisia selwynii Kindb.
 Pylaisia sericea De Not.
 Pylaisia simlaensis (Mitt.) A. Jaeger
 Pylaisia steerei (Ando & Higuchi) Ignatov
 Pylaisia subcircinata Cardot
 Pylaisia subdenticulata Schimp.
 Pylaisia subhomomalla (Müll. Hal.) A. Jaeger
 Pylaisia subimbricata Broth. & Paris
 Pylaisia tenuirostris (Bruch & Schimp. ex Sull.) A. Jaeger

References

Hypnales
Moss genera